is a Prefectural Natural Park in Tokushima Prefecture, Japan. Established in 2005, the park spans the borders of the municipalities of Kamiyama, Katsuura, Naka, Sanagōchi, and Tokushima.

See also
 National Parks of Japan

References

Parks and gardens in Tokushima Prefecture
Protected areas established in 2005
2005 establishments in Japan
Katsuura, Tokushima
Naka, Tokushima
Tokushima (city)
Kamiyama, Tokushima